Dean Murray may refer to:

 L. Dean Murray (born 1964), American member of the New York State Assembly
 Dean Murray (basketball) (born 1964), basketball coach